The Macon Whoopee or Macon Whoopees may refer to:
Macon Whoopee (CHL), an ice hockey team in the Central Hockey League from 1996 to 2001
Macon Whoopee (ECHL), an ice hockey team in the East Coast Hockey League during the 2001–02 season
Macon Whoopees (SHL), an ice hockey team in the Southern Hockey League during the 1973–74 season